Hartmuth Pfeil (13 February 1893 – 4 June 1962) was a German painter. His work was part of the painting event in the art competition at the 1936 Summer Olympics.

References

1893 births
1962 deaths
20th-century German painters
20th-century German male artists
German male painters
Olympic competitors in art competitions
Artists from Frankfurt